Dundo Airport, or Camaquenzo I Airport , is an airport serving the city of Dundo, the capital of Lunda Norte Province in Angola.

The Dundo (Ident: DU) non-directional beacon is located on the field.

Airlines and destinations

See also
 List of airports in Angola
 Transport in Angola

References

External links
 
 
OpenStreetMap - Dundo
OurAirports - Dundo

Airports in Angola
Dundo